Carlo Montanaro (born in Cecina) is an Italian violinist and conductor. He concentrates on Italian operas from Bel canto to verismo and also conducts selected works from the French repertoire.

Career 
Montanaro completed his violin studies at the Conservatorio Luigi Cherubini in Florence and began his musical career with the Orchestra del Maggio Musicale Fiorentino in 1991. He was discovered and promoted by Zubin Mehta, came to the University of Music and Performing Arts Vienna, where he studied conducting with Leopold Hager, Ervin Acél and Takuo Yuasa for three years.

Since 2001 he has been a guest at numerous opera houses worldwide:
 In Germany, he took on engagements at the Deutsche Oper Berlin, at the Württembergischen Staatsoper in Stuttgart and at the Semperoper in Dresden, Frankfurt am Main and Hamburg.
 Further engagements took him to St. Petersburg, Bilbao, Athens and Tel Aviv, Colorado, Denver and Seattle, to Montreal, to the New National Theatre Tokyo and to the Handa Opera Festival in Sydney.

From 2011 to 2014 he worked as music director at the Teatr Wielki in Warsaw.

He also regularly undertakes concert engagements, again focusing on works from the Italian repertoire, such as Verdi's Requiem.

References

External links 
 Carlo Montanaro on Opera musica
 Carlo Montanaro on GM Art & Music
 Carlo Monatanaro on Opéra de Montréal
  Bayerische Staatsoper München, notice
 Mariinsky Theater, notice
 Seattle Opera, notice
 Carlo Montanaro - Verdi - Giovanna d'Arco - Sinfonia (YouTube)

Year of birth missing (living people)
Musicians from Florence
Italian classical violinists
Italian male conductors (music)
Living people
20th-century Italian conductors (music)
21st-century Italian conductors (music)
21st-century classical violinists
20th-century Italian male musicians
21st-century Italian male musicians
Male classical violinists